Svidovica is a village in the municipality of Strumica, North Macedonia. It used to be part of the former municipality of Kukliš.

Demographics
According to the 2002 census, the village had a total of 325 inhabitants. Ethnic groups in the village include:

Macedonians 309
Turks 16

References

Villages in Strumica Municipality